Harry Ware (22 October 1911 – 28 October 1970) was an English footballer and manager. He played for Newcastle United, Norwich City, Sheffield Wednesday and Stoke City and managed Crewe Alexandra and Northwich Victoria.

Playing career
Ware was born in Birmingham before his family moved to Stoke-on-Trent. Ware played for Hanley St.Luke's and Stoke St. Peter's before joining Stoke City in 1930 and made his debut at the Victoria Ground against Burnley on 4 October 1930. He scored twice in eight matches in 1931–32 and then scored seven goals in 31 matches in 1932–33, helping Stoke to win the Second Division. Ware struggled to establish himself in the First Division and was sold to Newcastle United in the summer of 1935. He spent two seasons on Tyneside, scoring nine goals in 49 matches, and then spent three months at Sheffield Wednesday, scoring once. In November 1937 he joined Norwich City until World War II interrupted his career.

In March 1940 he joined Port Vale as a guest, before moving on to Northampton Town, Nottingham Forest, Stoke City, Crystal Palace and Watford, returning to Vale for two more guest appearances in December 1944, before joining Northwich Victoria.

Management career
After the war, Ware spent three spells in charge of Cheshire County League side Northwich Victoria between 1947 and 1953 and served Dutch side E.D.O. Haarlem as trainer-coach before returning to Burslem in November 1956 to serve Port Vale as a coach under manager Freddie Steele. He left Vale Park in June 1958 to become manager of Crewe Alexandra. He led the "Railwaymen" to 18th and 14th places finishes in the Fourth Division in 1958–59 and 1959–60. He spent 100 games in charge at Gresty Road, before leaving in May 1960. He moved on to Stoke City as assistant trainer, then reserve team manager, and finally a scout.

Career statistics

Playing statistics
Source:

Managerial statistics

Honours
Stoke City
 Football League Second Division: 1932–33

References

Footballers from Birmingham, West Midlands
English footballers
Association football forwards
Stoke City F.C. players
Newcastle United F.C. players
Sheffield Wednesday F.C. players
Norwich City F.C. players
Port Vale F.C. wartime guest players
Northampton Town F.C. wartime guest players
Nottingham Forest F.C. wartime guest players
Stoke City F.C. wartime guest players
Crystal Palace F.C. wartime guest players
Watford F.C. wartime guest players
Northwich Victoria F.C. players
English Football League players
English football managers
Northwich Victoria F.C. managers
Crewe Alexandra F.C. managers
English Football League managers
Association football coaches
Association football scouts
Port Vale F.C. non-playing staff
Stoke City F.C. non-playing staff
1911 births
1970 deaths